Ajatha Satruvu is a 1989 Indian Telugu-language action drama film directed by Vijaya Nirmala starring Krishna and Radha in the lead roles.  Shankar–Ganesh duo composed the film's soundtrack. The film was produced by P. Padmanabham for Makkal Thilagam Movies.

Cast 
 Krishna as Gopi Krishna
 Radha as Radha
 Jaggayya as Raghavaiah Naidu
 Giribabu as Sivaram
 Kota Srinivasa Rao as Papaala Parandhamaiah
 Suttivelu as Anand Rao
 Annapurna
Y. G. Mahendra (voiced by Rallapalli) as Chanti Babu
Nirmalamma as Kasulamma
Anuradha as Lalasa
Prabhakar Reddy as Durga Prasad
Tyagaraju as Chengaiah

Soundtrack

Release 
The film received U Certificate from the Madras regional office of the censor board with the certificate dated 12 December 1988. The film was released on 20 July 1989.

References

External links 
 Ajatha Satruvu on Twitter

1989 films
1989 action thriller films
Indian action thriller films
Films scored by Shankar–Ganesh
1980s Telugu-language films
Films directed by Vijaya Nirmala